Love's a Prima Donna is the fifth studio album by Steve Harley & Cockney Rebel, which was released by EMI in 1976. It was produced by Harley, and would be the band's last album before splitting in 1977.

Background
Harley began writing material for Love's a Prima Donna while Steve Harley & Cockney Rebel were touring to promote their 1976 album Timeless Flight. Recording sessions for the new album took place at Abbey Road Studios in London from June to September 1976. Once completed, guitarist Jim Cregan left Cockney Rebel to join Rod Stewart's touring band. 

The album's concept revolves around the theme of love, including "true love, lost love, mother-and-child love, soldier loneliness, valentine sentimentalism and a fan's infatuation with a musician". The album also showcases a range of musical styles, including progressive rock, folk, doo-wop, and reggae.

Speaking to Melody Maker in early 1977, Harley commented, 

In 2015, Harley revealed to guitar-bass.net the albums that have had the most influenced him, with one being Love's a Prima Donna. He revealed, "This is not self-indulgence, I swear! I gave free rein to Jim Cregan during the recordings and he rewarded me with some brilliant parts, which I could harmonise with the keyboards. The more outlandish my production became, the more Jim pushed himself. Cockney Rebel started as a non-guitar band, and here we are offering up lashings of electric mayhem!"

Song information
"G.I. Valentine", "Finally a Card Came", "Innocence and Guilt" and "Is It True What They Say?" all feature the use of the EMI voice vocoder. "Sidetrack II" is preceded by a non-album track, "Sidetrack 1", which was released as the B-side to "(I Believe) Love's a Prima Donna". It is the same song but where "Sidetrack II" is the "orchestral version" with a 50-piece orchestra and choir, "Sidetrack 1" is performed by Cockney Rebel using synthesisers, piano, electric guitar and percussion. Originally written at the piano, Harley wanted to "bring another dimension" to the track but felt it would have been "too self-indulgent" to include both versions on the album. "(If This Is Love) Give Me More", which Harley has described as a "spoof 50s doo-wop rock piece" with a "70s spoof lyric and 70s recording techniques", features him playing electric guitar for the first time on record.

"Here Comes the Sun", a cover of the 1969 George Harrison-penned song originally recorded by the Beatles, was the first cover version that the band chose to record. As a single, it was backed by another non-album track, "Lay Me Down". The seven-minute long "Innocent and Guilt" was later covered by German musician Guido Dossche. It first appeared on the 2004 single "Ich Bin Gotte", which featured Harley, and also appeared on Dossche's 2005 album Vulnerabel. In a June 2005 interview for the fan site Harley Fanzone, Dossche commented, "'Innocence and Guilt' always meant a lot to me, a grown up son hidden by his mother. She won't let him go because she's afraid to lose him, she wants to keep him for herself."

Release
While recording sessions for the album continued, EMI released "Here Comes the Sun" as a single in July 1976. Reaching number ten in the UK Singles Chart, the song's success coincided with an unusually hot British summer. Love's a Prima Donna was released by EMI in October 1976 and reached number 28 in the UK Albums Chart. During the same month, "(I Believe) Love's a Prima Donna" was released as the album's second single and peaked at number 41 in the UK Singles Chart. EMI originally intended to release "(Love) Compared with You" as the third UK single, but the release was cancelled, although the song was later released as the album's only US single. Love's a Prima Donna was released in the US on 10 January 1977.

The album received its first CD release by EMI in 1990. In 2001, BGO Records released the album as a double CD set with the band's 1976 US compilation A Closer Look.

Tour
Following the album's release, the band embarked on an eight-date UK tour from 2 to 12 December 1976. For the tour, Cregan was replaced by Jo Partridge, who first joined the band as rhythm guitarist on the Timeless Flight tour. Partridge contributed to the recording of two tracks on Love's a Prima Donna, providing guitar and backing vocals on "Here Comes the Sun", and backing vocals on "(If This Is Love) Give Me More". During the tour, Harley had a number of the concerts recorded, which he used to create the double live album Face to Face: A Live Recording. It was released in 1977 and includes six tracks from Love's a Prima Donna.

Critical reception

On its release, Geoff Barton of Sounds commented, "Love's a Prima Donna goes closer to the bone than ever before. In the past, Harley's lyrics have tended to be oblique and obscure. With this album, however, he appears to be laying his life on the line - and it's often quite a painful thing to see. The album is loosely conceptual, each sentiment comes across intensely, cutting through the listener like a keen blade. Suffice it to say that it is an incredible album, the playing and its overall structure being unparalleled, voice effects and stacatto instrumental breaks abounding. Love's a Prima Donna is often amusing, sometimes embarrassing, but also - in a twisted, tangled sort of way - infinitely enjoyable." Barry Cain of Record Mirror wrote, "Choirs, nursery noises, nubile Lancashire lasses, you name it - Steve Harley's got it on his new album. He uses every conceivable gimmick in the book on this, his strongest LP to date. So what if the guy can't sing a note. He doesn't seem to be taking himself quite so seriously these days... and that makes for a flexible, more relaxed sound. A great album."

Rex Anderson, writing for the EMI Records Weekly News magazine Music Talk, said, "The album is Steve's look at love. He sees it as a necessary evil, as something both dirty and beautiful. Much of it is, of necessity, sexual, but it is also comic and tragic. Musically the album is a masterpiece." Paul Phillips of National RockStar said, "'Here Comes The Sun' bears all the hallmarks of the accomplished lyricist desperately attempting to become the acclaimed musician/arranger - mistaking clumsiness for cleverness and arrogance for art. Unfortunately, these faults permeate the entire album. '(Love) Compared With You' and 'Carry Me Again' are two tracks which work, not because they are simple songs, but because they are simply presented. What spoils the rest of the album is the desperation which attends Harley's efforts to be musical/innovative/disturbing. A pity that such a promising and outrageous talent as Harley's should be allowed to stoop to the low level which this album achieves."

Jon Marlowe of the American newspaper The Miami News concluded, "This is the one that should make Harley/Cockney Rebel as big in America as they are in their native England. With Love's a Prima Donna, Harley has decided to undertake the tattered and worn idea of a concept LP - but don't fear, the kid pulls it off in grande musical style." Henry McNulty of the Hartford Courant wrote, "Steve Harley and his band combine three separate trends in British rock: artiness of the Roxy-Bowie school, lyrical complexity, and a touch of heavy metal. Love's a Prima Donna is an excellent showcase for the band." Cash Box commented: "Harley's efforts to break big in the U.S. rock market have not been outstanding, although he always seems to make a dent. The import version has gotten play, but the album is uneven and at times esoteric."

Retrospective reviews

Donald A. Guarisco of AllMusic, retrospectively wrote, "This album allowed [Harley] to give full vent to his romantic thoughts via lushly crafted songs about the travails of love. Harley's ambitions occasionally overwhelm him, but the best songs rank with Harley's finest work and the album manages to overcome its occasional excesses thanks to a crisp, consistent production that keeps its genre-hopping sounding smooth. In short, it takes a few listens to assimilate, but it is an impressively crafted album that offers plenty of rewards for Harley fans and anyone who can appreciate glam rock at its most artsy."

Track listing

Personnel
Steve Harley & Cockney Rebel
Steve Harley – vocals, electric guitar (track 9)
Jim Cregan – lead guitar
Duncan Mackay – keyboards
George Ford – bass guitar
Stuart Elliott – drums

Additional musicians
Lindsey Elliott – percussion
Jo Partridge – guitar (track 11), backing vocals (tracks 9, 11)
Tony Rivers – backing vocals (various tracks), backing vocal arrangement (tracks 5–6, 10)
John G. Perry – backing vocals (various tracks)
Stuart Calver – backing vocals (various tracks)
Yvonne Keeley – backing vocals (track 2)
English Chamber Choir – choir (tracks 1, 7-8)

Production
Steve Harley – producer
Wilf Gibson – choir arrangements (tracks 1, 8), string section score (track 5), orchestral arrangement (track 7)
Tony Clark – engineer
Pat Stapley – assistant engineer
Ken Perry – mastering

Design
Julie Harris – outer sleeve art direction for Splash Studios
Mick Rock – inner bag art direction
John Harwood – front sleeve colouring

Charts

References

Steve Harley & Cockney Rebel albums
1976 albums
EMI Records albums